Jon Hynes is an American classical concert pianist.

Biography
A native of Little Rock, Arkansas, Hynes is a graduate of the Eastman School of Music in Rochester, New York. His teachers included Vitaly Margulis and Natalya Antonova. Hynes spent two years at the Paris Conservatory in France before completing his doctoral degree from the Eastman School. He has performed around the world at venues such as St. Martin-in-the-Fields in London, the International Musicora Festival in Paris and the Gnessin School of Music in Moscow.

Hynes is a prize-winning pianist of several competitions, including the gold medal of the 1990 Nena Wideman Competition, the Eastman Concerto Competition, and the Young Keyboard Artists International Competition. 
He is a frequent adjudicator, lecturer, and clinician throughout the United States.

References

American classical pianists
Male classical pianists
American male pianists
Living people
21st-century classical pianists
21st-century American male musicians
21st-century American pianists
Year of birth missing (living people)
Musicians from Little Rock, Arkansas
Eastman School of Music alumni